Thomas Taylor  was an 18th-century Anglican priest in Ireland

Taylor was educated at Trinity College, Dublin. He was Archdeacon of Ardagh from 1705 until 1747.

References

18th-century Irish Anglican priests
Archdeacons of Ardagh